Andrew Anthony R. Gallinagh (born 16 March 1985) is an English footballer who plays for Stratford Town. He plays as a defender or central midfielder.

Career
Gallinagh spent a year in Coventry City's youth system, before leaving and signing for Stratford Town after an unsuccessful trial with Crewe Alexandra. He broke into the first team squad when he was 17. A year later, in 2003, he joined the Cheltenham Town Centre of Excellence, and signed a professional contract in 2004. He made his full debut for Cheltenham in the Robins' 5–0 win over Mansfield Town on the final day of the 2005–06 season.

In the 2007–08 season he made 25 first team appearances and won Cheltenham's 'Young Player of the Year' award. In May 2008, Gallinagh signed a new two-year contract with Cheltenham. Gallinagh has said in an interview in 2009 he supports Aston Villa F.C.

In September 2011 Gallinagh joined Bath City on a one-month emergency loan that was extended to another month on 28 October. He scored his first goal for the club in the fourth qualifying round of the FA Cup against Dover Athletic.

On 20 July 2012 Gallinagh joined Hereford United on a free transfer from Bath City after impressing in pre-season.
Despite being a regular in the first team line up until the turn of the year Gallinagh was released at the end of the season after missing the majority of the final three months of the campaign through injury.

In June 2013, he re-joined Bath City permanently.

Since 2017 Gallinagh has returned to his first club, Stratford, in the Evo Stik South league.

External links 
Andy Gallinagh player profile at ctfc.com

References

1985 births
Living people
Sportspeople from Sutton Coldfield
English footballers
Association football defenders
Stratford Town F.C. players
Cheltenham Town F.C. players
Bath City F.C. players
Hereford United F.C. players
English Football League players
National League (English football) players